Cataractes District was a district located in the Kongo Central province, in the Democratic Republic of the Congo. It dated back to the days of the Congo Free State and the Belgian Congo.

History

Article 3 of the decree of 16 April 1887 provided for the Congo Free State to be divided into administrative districts headed by district commissioners, assisted by one or more deputies.
The decree of 1 August 1888 divided the Congo Free State into eleven districts, of which the first five were in the lower Congo region, including Cataractes District with its headquarters at Lukunga.

Cataractes District is shown on a map of the colony in 1897 as bordered by French possessions to the north and Portuguese possessions to the south.
It lay between Matadi District to the west and Stanley Pool District to the east.
Other maps show an extension of Kwango-Oriental District reaching the southeast of Cataractes District.
In 1910 the districts of Banana, Boma, Matadi and Cataracts were consolidated into the Bas-Congo District.

In 1933 the original four provinces of the Belgian Congo were reorganized into six provinces, named after their capitals, and the central government assumed more control.
Congo-Kasaï province was split, with the western part renamed Léopoldville Province.
The number of districts was reduced to 15.
Léopoldville Province contained the urban district of Léopoldville and the districts of Bas-Congo, Kwango and Lac Léopold II.
Some of the districts were later divided up.
A 1955-1957 map shows Cataractes District extending east from a greatly reduced Bas-Congo District and northeast along the Congo River past the urban district of Léopoldville up to Lac Léopold II District. It bordered Kwango District and Kwilu District to the east.

Maps

See also
Districts of the Congo Free State
Districts of the Belgian Congo
Districts of the Democratic Republic of the Congo

References

Sources

Districts of the Congo Free State
Districts of the Belgian Congo
Districts of Kongo Central